Fissicrambus hemiochrellus is a moth in the family Crambidae. It was described by Zeller in 1877. It is found in North America, where it has been recorded from Alabama, Florida, Georgia, Mississippi and Oklahoma.

The wingspan is about 21 mm. Adults are on wing nearly year-round.

References

Crambini
Moths described in 1877
Moths of North America